The Renault RS10 was a Formula 1 car developed to compete in the 1979 Formula One season, which became the first turbocharged F1 car to win a Grand Prix. This changed the framework of F1 as this car spurred the development of the  turbocharged cars of the 1980s and rang the death knell for normally aspirated engines. This car, along with its predecessor, the Renault RS01, was one of the most revolutionary Grand Prix cars of all time.

Development 

The RS10 was designed and developed by François Castaing, Michel Tétu and Marcel Hubert and was developed from the much-maligned RS01. The RS01 was conceived alongside Renault's effort to build a turbocharged Le Mans winning car. The RS01 was no more than a development mule for the 1.5-litre turbocharged engine.
Jean-Pierre Jabouille with his engineering degree, mechanical aptitude and driving skill was hired to run Renault's F1 program in 1977. Jabouille worked to develop this engine over the 1977-1979 seasons. The Renault turbo effort was a joke along the paddock as the RS01 earned the moniker "Yellow Teapot" as its race would often end with the yellow car smoking and parked. It would not be long however, before the jokes and laughs along the grid turned to panic.

The RS10 was finally built in 1979 as a serious contender with a Renault Gordini twin-turbo 1.5-litre V6. Where the RS10 differed from the RS01, however, was that it incorporated twin-turbochargers, a 6-speed transmission and a completely new ground effect chassis.

Racing history 

The RS10 was introduced a third of the way through the 1979 season at the 1979 Spanish Grand Prix. Initially only one car was available for Jean-Pierre Jabouille and it retained the single turbocharger of its predecessor. At the Monaco Grand Prix a second car became available for René Arnoux and twin turbochargers were used for the first time. 

Though reliability issues still plagued the new twin-turbo, its pace made the paddock finally take notice. Through the final eight races of the season the RS10 scored five poles and one memorable home win at the 1979 French Grand Prix at Dijon-Prenois. More wins would surely have followed if not for the engine troubles. Jabouille in particular saw his hard work hardly rewarded thanks to the new engine technology. His win in Dijon though, in front of home fans with an all French car, engine, tyres and even French fuel (Elf), was his prize for three hard years of no results.

Legacy 

The car and team that began as a joke quickly had the paddock scrambling. Ferrari and Brabham (using BMW engines) quickly put together a turbo program in the 1980s, soon to be joined by the likes of McLaren (TAG-Porsche) and Williams (Honda). The other major manufactures did so as well as the turbo cars began to gain power and reliability. Soon all the major teams had forced-induction power. The smaller, mainly British teams (most notably Tyrrell who were the last major team to turn to turbo power, Renault no less, in ) lacked the funding to obtain this technology and their results suffered. The turbos became so disparagingly fast that FISA adopted a non turbo cup in 1987 known as the Jim Clark Cup.

Turbo pioneers Renault never won a championship using the technology, although they did manage two runner-up positions. Conclusively, their vision in the late 1970s sparked a new era in Formula One.

Complete Formula One results
(key) (results in bold indicate pole position; results in italics indicate fastest lap)

References

http://www.f1technical.net/f1db/cars/433 
http://www.f1-grandprix.com/history5.html#Turbos

RS10
1979 Formula One season cars